Uchiyama is a Japanese surname. Notable people with the surname include:
Akira Uchiyama (born 1954), Japanese politician of the Democratic Party of Japan
Atsushi Uchiyama (born 1959), former Japanese football player
Uchiyama Gudō (1874–1911), Sōtō Zen priest and anarcho-socialist activist executed in the High Treason Incident
, Japanese rower
Kanzō Uchiyama (内山 完造, 1885–1959), Japanese bookstore owner
Kōki Uchiyama (born 1990), Japanese actor and voice actor from Saitama Prefecture
Kiyoshi Uchiyama, Japanese consul to the Philippines before WW2
Kōshō Uchiyama (1912–1998), Soto priest, origami master, former abbot of Antaiji near Kyoto, Japan
, Japanese table tennis player
Masaru Uchiyama (born 1957), former Japanese football player
Masato Uchiyama, Japanese actor
, Japanese boxer
Rina Uchiyama (born 1981), Japanese actress
Takashi Uchiyama (born 1979), super featherweight boxer from Japan
Toshihiko Uchiyama (disambiguation), multiple people
, Japanese tennis player
, Japanese artistic gymnast
, Japanese footballer
, Japanese voice actress

See also
Okamoto–Uchiyama cryptosystem, discovered in 1998 by T. Okamoto and S. Uchiyama
Siege of Uchiyama, one of many battles fought in Takeda Shingen's bid to gain control of Shinano Province
Uchiyama Station, train station in Kurobe, Toyama Prefecture, Japan

Japanese-language surnames